Bivouac Felice Giordano is a refuge in the Alps in Aosta Valley, Italy.

Mountain huts in the Alps
Mountain huts in Aosta Valley
Gressoney-La-Trinité